Paul Kuën (8 April 1910 – April 1997) was a German operatic tenor known for character roles. One example among many such portrayals would be Mime in Wagner's Der Ring des Nibelungen.

Kuën was born at Sulzberg, Oberallgäu.  He had originally wanted to be an organ-builder, but then studied singing with Heinrich Knote and Adalbert Ebner in Munich. He made his stage debut at the State Theatre in Konstanz in 1933 and went on to sing in many European opera houses, including Munich State Opera from 1946, Bayreuth where he sang from 1951–1957, Salzburg, the Vienna State Opera, the Bavarian State Opera, and London's Royal Opera House. He made his debut at the New York Metropolitan Opera on 16 December 1961 as Mime in Das Rheingold. He also sang Mime in the Met's 1962 Siegfried and the multiple roles of Andrès, Cochenille, Pitichinaccio, and Frantz in the company's 1962 production of The Tales of Hoffmann.

A Kammersänger of the Federal Republic of Germany, Paul Kuën taught singing following his retirement from the operatic stage. Amongst his pupils was the noted lieder singer, Christian Gerhaher. In 1976, he published his autobiography, Allgäuer Lausbub erobert die Bühnen der Welt (A rascal from Allgäu conquers the stages of the world).

Recordings
Kuën can be heard on many recordings of Wagner's operas, including performances conducted by Herbert von Karajan, Joseph Keilberth, Clemens Krauss, Hans Knappertsbusch, and Sir Georg Solti. He also appears on recordings of several rarely performed German operas such as Goetz's Der Widerspenstigen Zähmung, Lortzing's  Die beiden Schützen, Nicolai's Die lustigen Weiber von Windsor, and Orff's Der Mond, Die Kluge and Antigonae.

References 

Ashman, Mike, Booklet Notes: Siegfried, Testament Records, SBT4 1392, 2006, p. 7. Accessed 13 February 2009.
Corbet, August et al., Algemene muziekencyclopedie, Zuid-Nederlandse Uitg., 1957, Vol. 4. p. 175.
Library of Congress (Authority control), Kuen, Paul, 1910-1997. Accessed 28 December February 2011.
Kutsch, K.J. and Riemens, Leo, Unvergängliche Stimmen, Francke Verlag Bern, 1962, . Accessed 13 February 2009
Metropolitan Opera Archives, Kuen, Paul (Tenor). Accessed 13 February 2009.
Sabin, Robert Review of Das Rheingold, New York Metropolitan  Opera, 16 December 1961, Musical America, February 1962 (reprinted in the Metropolitan Opera archives). Accessed 13 February 2009.

External links
Discography on arkivmusic.com

German operatic tenors
1910 births
1997 deaths
20th-century German male opera singers
People from Oberallgäu